State Route 28 (SR 28) is a  state highway in Douglas County, Carson City, and Washoe County in western Nevada, United States, that runs along the northeastern shore of Lake Tahoe. SR 28 connects U.S. Route 50 (US 50) in Douglas County with California State Route 28 at Crystal Bay. SR 28 has been part of the Nevada scenic byway system since June 1994 and the National Scenic Byway system since September 1996.

Route description

SR 28 begins at Spooner Junction, a T intersection with US 50 (also known as the Lincoln Highway) and SR 28 on the border between the Humboldt–Toiyabe National Forest and the Lake Tahoe – Nevada State Park in northwestern Douglas County, just south of Spooner Lake. (US 50 heads west toward Zephyr Cove, South Lake Tahoe, California and eventually Sacramento and east toward Carson City and Fallon.)

From its southern terminus SR 28 heads northwest, initially along the border between the national forest and the state park. After about  the highway leaves Douglas County and enters Carson City (independent city) and fully enters the state park. Shortly thereafter the highway crosses over North Canyon Creek, and about  after entering the state park, the highway leaves the park and enters the Humboldt–Toiyabe National Forest. Assuming a northerly course, SR 28 continues through the national forest and, after about another , the highway leave Carson City and enters Washoe County.

Just over  after entering Washoe County, SR 28 begins a segment (of approximately ) which runs along the east shore of Lake Tahoe. About  along this segment, SR 28 leaves the national forest to renter the state park. The route then passes just east of the Sand Harbor area of the state park, site of the annual Lake Tahoe Shakespeare Festival. North of Sand Harbor, SR 28 is also known as Tahoe Boulevard. Just over  after reentering the state park, the route finally leaves it, briefly passes through another short section of the national forest, and enters the census-designated place of Incline Village.

Upon entering Incline Village, the route leaves the Lake Tahoe shoreline and connects with the eastern end of Lakeshore Boulevard at a T intersection (which heads west to reconnect with SR 28) and then turns to a westerly heading through the community. About  after entering the community, near the west side of town, SR 28 connects with the southern end of Nevada State Route 431 (SR 431) at a roundabout. (SR 431, also known as Mount Rose Highway, heads northeasterly towards Reno.) About  later SR 28 reconnects with Lakeshore Boulevard. At that intersection, Tahoe Boulevard ends and SR 28 begins running along Lakeshore Boulevard. Continuing west, the highway resumes running along the shore of Lake Tahoe before it leaves Incline Village and turns south toward census-designated place of Crystal Bay.

In southern Crystal Bay, the route turns west and promptly reaches its western terminus at the California state line and the eastern end of California State Route 28 at an intersection with Stateline Road. (California State Route 28 continues west through the census-designated place and border community of Kings Beach (including the community of Brockway) and on to Tahoe Vista and Tahoe City.

At a point near the northern intersection of Lakeshore Boulevard, around 12,900 cars travel along SR 28 on average each day.

History
The road that became SR 28, used for flumes in the timber industry since 1880, was paved around 1932. The route first appeared in 1948, with the same general alignment as it has today. The highway gained fame for many years as the location of the Ponderosa Ranch, filming location of the television series Bonanza that is located on the east end of Incline Village. On June 7, 1994, the Nevada Department of Transportation (NDOT) designated SR 28 as a scenic byway, named North Shore Road. Later in September 1996, SR 28 and part of US 50 was designated as Lake Tahoe - Eastshore Drive, a National Scenic Byway.

Major intersections
Note: Mileposts in Nevada reset at county lines; the start and end mileposts for each county are given in the county column.

References

External links

 AARoads: Nevada 28

Lake Tahoe
National Scenic Byways
Nevada Scenic Byways
State highways in Nevada
Nevada State Route 28
Nevada State Route 28
Nevada State Route 28